Abandon Kansas is an American alternative rock band originating from Wichita, Kansas that formed in 2005 and went on indefinite hiatus in 2015. The band has rebranded to Glass Age in 2019 and is making new music.

History 
Abandon Kansas formed in 2005 in Wichita, Kansas.  The origins of the band's name is a play on the words A band in Kansas.  Abandon Kansas released their first EP independently in 2005.  It was self-titled and received little recognition.  Since then, Abandon Kansas has slowly gained recognition in the Christian music market, achieving recognition by radio vehicles such as RadioU, video vehicles such as TVU, and music review websites such as Jesus Freak Hideout and Indie Vision Music.  Gaining attention from local, independent, and few national venues, Abandon Kansas continued releasing records.  3 EPs and 1 full-length album were released from 2006-2009.

In 2009, Abandon Kansas signed with Gotee Records, a diverse record label founded by the Christian pop musician, TobyMac.  In the months proceeding, Abandon Kansas released one project. Their debut EP on Gotee Records, We're All Going Somewhere, was released on September 8, 2009.  It contained no tracks that would be repeated on their proceeding full-length release, Ad Astra per Aspera. The song, "Months and Years," listed as track 5, was placed in regular rotation by RadioU, a national radio vehicle broadcasting from Ohio and California as well as from repeaters across the United States.

In 2011, Abandon Kansas released a second self-titled EP one month before releasing their debut album on Gotee Records. Abandon Kansas was released on February 8, 2011 and contained four songs (including two repeats from their 2009 release) and two videos. Ad Astra per Aspera was released on March 8, 2011 and contained two songs from their 2011 EP.  Abandon Kansas is currently on tour to promote their full-length release.  "Heaven Come My Way," listed as track one, is currently in rotation on RadioU.

Abandon Kansas performed on the "Mother, May I?" tour with Wavorly and Hyland.  In early 2011, they had toured with Swimming with Dolphins, as well as Mike Mains and the Branches and From Indian Lakes on the first leg of the Ad Astra Per Aspera Record Release Tour.  On the second leg of the tour, they performed with Showbread, Quiet Science, and The Wedding.

In 2014, Abandon Kansas signed to Emery's  independent record label and is going to release the third full-length album alligator on May 11, 2015.

In June 2015, a post on the Abandon Kansas Facebook page stated the following which has put the band in an indefinite hiatus: "Due to personal and relational circumstances in my life, I have decided it would be best for me and my family to cancel the rest of AK's tour dates in 2015. This is embarrassing, and I apologize for not being in a healthy enough state of mind to perform and tour. It's become clear that I need to take care of myself and deal with issues that have long been ignored. I am already in the process of doing this now. If you've purchased tickets, please still go to the shows and support the other bands. Thank you for your love and support - Jeremy;"

Band members

Current
 Jeremy Spring - lead vocals, guitar
 Nick Patrick - bass
 Logan Rine - guitar

Former
 Brian Scheideman - drums
 Brian Nixon - keys, backing vocals
 Chris Martin - bass
 Sam Presley - bass
 Tyler Clarensau - keys, Guitar
 Brad Regier - drums
 Chet Kueffer - bass
 Michael Whipple - bass
 Brad Foster - Guitar
 Derek Harsch - Keys

Discography

Studio albums

Studio EPs

References

External links 

 

American Christian rock groups
Gotee Records artists
Musical groups established in 2005